Muqaddar Ka Sikandar is a 1978 Indian drama film produced and directed by Prakash Mehra, and written by Kader Khan, Vijay Kaul and Laxmikant Sharma. It stars Amitabh Bachchan, in his fifth of nine films with Prakash Mehra to date, along with Vinod Khanna, Raakhee, Rekha, Ranjeet, Amjad Khan in pivotal roles, while Nirupa Roy, Kader Khan gave special appearances. The film tells of the story of Sikandar (played by Amitabh Bachchan), an orphan raised in the slums of Bombay. The film's plot is loosely inspired by the Bengali novel Devdas (1917).

Muqaddar Ka Sikandar was the highest-grossing Bollywood film of 1978, and the biggest Diwali blockbuster of all time. It was also the third highest-grossing Indian film of the decade, after Sholay and Bobby. Muqaddar Ka Sikandar was also an overseas blockbuster in the Soviet Union.

At the 26th Filmfare Awards, it was nominated for nine Filmfare Awards, including Best Film, but did not win in any category. It was remade into the Telugu film Prema Tarangalu (1980), and in Tamil as Amara Kaaviyam (1981). The movie was the last movie of Amitabh Bachchan and Vinod Khanna.

Plot
An orphan boy (Mayur Raj Verma) begins working in the house of a wealthy man named Ramnath (Shriram Lagoo). Ramnath does not like him. It is later revealed that another orphan had killed his wife, hence his animosity. Ramnath's young daughter Kaamna, however, empathizes with the boy and they form a friendship. Eventually, the boy is adopted by a Muslim woman named Fatima (Nirupa Roy) who also works for Ramnath, and who names him Sikandar (meaning "Conqueror"). On the occasion of Kaamna's birthday, Sikandar is refused entry to the party, and when he breaks into Kaamna's room to deliver her gift he is caught and accused of trying to rob the house. He and his mother are banished from Ramnath's home. Shortly thereafter, Fatima dies, leaving young Sikandar with the responsibility of looking after her daughter, Mehroo. A fakir, Darvesh Baba (Kader Khan) advises the mourning Sikandar to embrace the woes of life and find happiness in sadness, for then he would become the conqueror of fate.

The film cuts to grown up Sikandar (Amitabh Bachchan), revealing he has amassed a fortune by turning in smugglers and thieves to the police and receiving the reward payouts. With all his wealth, he has managed to build an impressive house for himself and Mehroo, along with setting up a profitable business. He still has not forgotten Kaamna (Raakhee). She and her father have fallen on hard times, but they snub all offers from Sikandar to become reacquainted. When Sikandar tries to speak to Kaamna she demands that he never speak to her again. Sikandar is upset by this and becomes a heavy drinker. He also begins to visit Zohra Begum's (Rekha) kotha (brothel) on a regular basis. Zohra falls into an unrequited love with Sikander and begins to refuse other clients.

One night in a bar, Sikandar is introduced to Vishal Anand (Vinod Khanna), a down-on-his-luck lawyer. A friendship is formed when Vishal risks his own life to save Sikandar from a bomb blast. Vishal and his mother move into Sikandar's house.

A criminal named Dilawar (Amjad Khan) is in love with Zohra, and learns about her love for Sikandar. Dilawar confronts Sikandar and in the ensuing fight is thrashed by him. He swears to kill Sikandar.

At length Ramnath and Kaamna, who have been struggling financially, discover that Sikandar has been anonymously paying their bills. Ramnath goes to thank him. The two households become friendly, and Vishal begins to work with Ramnath. Encouraged, Sikandar tries to profess his love to Kaamna through a love letter. Because Sikandar himself is illiterate, Vishal transcribes the letter for him, but the plan backfires when Kaamna mistakes the letter as actually being from Vishal. Vishal is unaware that Kaamna is the girl Sikandar loves, and they begin to date. Sikandar, upon learning this, struggles with his emotions but decides he must sacrifice his love for the sake of his friendship with Vishal. He covers up any evidence of his feelings toward Kaamna, and at his urging, Vishal and Kaamna plan to marry.

Meanwhile, the marriage of Mehroo is at risk of being cancelled; her fiancé's family have learned about Sikandar's frequent visits to Zohra, and they object to the union on these grounds. Vishal, knowing Sikandar won't change, visits Zohra and offers to pay her if she agrees to abandon Sikandar. Zohra, upon learning the reason, refuses the money but promises Vishal that she would rather die than let Sikandar visit her again. Later, Sikandar arrives at Zohra's. When she is unable to stop his entry, she kills herself by consuming poison hidden in her diamond ring, and dies in his arms.

Dilawar in the meantime has formed an alliance with Sikandar's arch enemy, J. D. (Ranjeet), and upon learning of Zohra's death hatches a plan to destroy Sikandar and his family. Kaamna and Mehroo are both preparing for their weddings; J. D. and his henchmen kidnap Mehroo but Vishal follows them and rescues her. Dilawar kidnaps Kaamna, but Sikandar follows him. He rescues Kaamna and sends her home while he fights Dilawar. In the final battle, both Dilawar and Sikandar are mortally wounded and Dilawar is surprised to learn that Sikandar never loved Zohra. A dying Sikandar reaches the wedding of Kaamna and Vishal. Just as the wedding ceremony is completed, Sikandar collapses. His dying words inadvertently reveal his love for Kaamna, and Vishal sings him a reprise from the movie's theme song: "Life is going to betray you someday... Death is your true love as it will take you along..." Sikandar's entire life flashes before him and he dies in Vishal's arms just as the song is completed. The film ends with the wedding having become a funeral.

Cast 

 Amitabh Bachchan as Sikandar
 Vinod Khanna as Vishal Anand
 Raakhee as Kaamna
 Rekha as Zohra Bai
 Ranjeet as J.D.
 Amjad Khan as Dilawar
 Nirupa Roy as Fatima
 Kader Khan as Darvesh Baba
 Shreeram Lagoo as Ramnath
 Goga Kapoor as Goga
 Ram Sethi as Pyarelal
 Manmohan Krishna as Piano Instructor
 Paidi Jairaj as Dr. Kapoor
 Yusuf Khan as Paul
 Vikas Anand as Police Inspector
 Sulochana Latkar as Vishal's Mother
 Sunder as Bus Conductor
 Mayur Raj Verma as Young Sikandar

Soundtrack
The Soundtrack was composed by the duo of the brothers Kalyanji Anandji, with the lyrics by Anjaan and Prakash Mehra (Salaam-e-Ishq).

Beside Kishore Kumar and Mahendra Kapoor, Mohd. Rafi's voice was used in the movie for the Kishore Kumar song Rote Hue Ate Hain Sab. Mohd. Rafi wanted Kishore Kumar to sing the sad version, but as insisted by Music Director Kalyanji Anandji, that his voice suited the sad version best, Mohd. Rafi had agreed to sing the song Zindagi to Bewafaa Hai. The song was picturised on Vinod Khanna during the Amitabh death scene.

Box office
It was the highest-grossing film of the year, as well as the third highest-grossing film of the decade, after Sholay (1975) and Bobby (1973). The film was a blockbuster, according to Box Office India. The film was such a huge hit, that people used to stand in queues, waiting endlessly, to buy the film's tickets. Sometimes the crowds slept in front of the cinema halls overnight in their wait for the tickets.

Worldwide, the film grossed .

In terms of footfalls, the film sold an estimated million tickets in India, and 25.2million tickets in the Soviet Union, for an estimated total of million tickets sold worldwide.

Accolades

See also
Amar Akbar Anthony
Coolie (1983 film)
Muslim social

Notes

References

External links 

1970s Hindi-language films
1970s masala films
1978 films
Films directed by Prakash Mehra
Films scored by Kalyanji Anandji
Hindi films remade in other languages
Urdu films remade in other languages
1970s Urdu-language films
Urdu-language Indian films